Thina may refer to:

, a Buddhist term sometimes translated as "sloth"
Thina River, a tributary of the Mzimvubu River of South Africa
, an ancient Greek name of China
Thinae or Thina, an ancient Greek name for one of the capital cities of China
, the Malayalam name for foxtail millet

People
Thina Thorleifsen (1885–1959), Norwegian politician
Thina Chat, vocalist of the Greek band Dakrya

See also
Tina (disambiguation)
Thena, a Marvel Comics character